The 1953 Western Illinois Leathernecks football team represented Western Illinois University as a member of the Interstate Intercollegiate Athletic Conference (IIAC) during the 1953 college football season. They were led by fifth-year head coach Vince DiFrancesca and played their home games at Hanson Field. The Leathernecks finished the season with a 8–2 record overall and a 5–1 record in conference play, placing second in the IIAC. They were invited to the postseason Corn Bowl, where they defeated  32–0.

Schedule

References

Western Illinois
Western Illinois Leathernecks football seasons
Western Illinois Leathernecks football